Anoplocaryum is a genus of flowering plants belonging to the family Boraginaceae.

Its native range is Siberia to Mongolia and Northwestern Himalaya.

Species:

Anoplocaryum compressum 
Anoplocaryum helenae 
Anoplocaryum tenellum 
Anoplocaryum turczaninowii

References

Boraginaceae
Boraginaceae genera